Herimanana Razafimahefa (born 1957) is a Malagasy politician who is serving as President of the Senate of Madagascar as of January 2021, succeeding Rivo Rakotovao. He was previously a senator representing Antananarivo, and ran unopposed for the president of the senate position.

In August 2020, following a reorganization of the Ministry of National Education, Technical and Vocational Education (MENETP), Razafimahefa was reappointed secretary general of the Ministry of National Education. While in the education ministry, he also made international news in April 2020 for supporting president Andry Rajoelina's recommendation to use a certain herbal drink to protect people from COVID-19.

Razafimahefa was described by the In Transformation Initiative newsletter as a "fierce Rajoelina loyalist".

Razafimahefa has worked as a minister of energy and mines.

References 

1957 births
Living people
Presidents of the Senate (Madagascar)